Excess All Areas is the third album by the Birmingham, England band Shy. Recorded in the Netherlands with producer Neil Kernon, the album was published in 1987 on RCA/BMG. The album featured Shy's biggest hit, "Break Down The Walls", co-written with Don Dokken and reached Britain's top 75, with Metal Hammer magazine being appreciative.

Track listing
Side one
"Emergency" (Michael Bolton, Duane Hitchings) - 3:35
"Can't Fight the Nights" (Michael Jay, Steve Harris, Tony Mills) - 3:59
"Young Heart" (Harris, Hitchings, Mills) - 3:55
"Just Love Me" (John Parker, Mills) - 3:58
"Break Down the Walls" (Don Dokken, Alan Kelly, Neil Kernon, Shy) - 5:04

Side two
"Under Fire" (Harris, Mills, Kelly) - 4:14
"Devil Woman" (Terry Britten, Christine Holmes) - 3:32 (Cliff Richard cover)
"Talk to Me" (Harris, Kelly, Paddy McKenna) - 3:51
"When the Love Is Over" (Jay, Harris, Mills) - 4:22
"Telephone" (Harris, Kelly) - 4:14

Personnel
Shy
 Tony Mills – vocals
 Steve Harris – guitar
 Roy Stephen Davis – bass
 Alan Kelly – drums
 Paddy McKenna – keyboards

Production
Neil Kernon - producer, engineer, mixing
Frank Koppelman, John Smit, Matt Budd - engineers
John Parker - associate producer on track 4

References

External links
 

1987 albums
Albums produced by Neil Kernon
RCA Records albums